This list of fictional penguins is subsidiary to the list of fictional birds and is a collection of various notable penguin characters that appear in various works of fiction. It is limited to well-referenced examples of penguins in literature, film, television, comics, animation, and video games.

Literature

Comics

Theatre

In media

Animation

Video games

Other media (toys, mascots, logos, etc.)

See also
List of fictional birds

References

Penguins